Neil Komadoski may refer to either of two ice hockey players:

Neil Komadoski (ice hockey, born 1951), who played for the Los Angeles Kings and St. Louis Blues in the 1970s
Neil Komadoski (ice hockey, born 1982), ice hockey player in the St. Louis Blues organization